Condition Red, Red Rockers' first full-length album, was released in 1981 on 415 Records. It was recorded at the famed Automatt studio in San Francisco. The Dead Kennedys' Jello Biafra sings background vocals on Folsom Prison Blues. The song Dead Heroes was included on Rodney Bingenheimer's punk compilation album, The Best Of Rodney On The ROQ.
Joe Ohliger III directed a music video for "Guns Of Revolution", as part of an interview for Videowest, an independent television studio that was based in San Francisco. It was shot at Fort Point in San Francisco, at the foot of the Golden Gate Bridge.

Track listing
"Guns Of Revolution"
"Teenage Underground"
"Peer Pressure"
"Can You Hear"
"Grow Up"
"Know What I Think"
"Dead Heroes"
"Folsom Prison Blues"
"Condition Red"
"Hold On"
"White Law"
"Live Or Die"

References

1981 debut albums
Red Rockers albums
Albums produced by David Kahne
415 Records albums